Allenswood Boarding Academy (also known as Allenswood Academy or Allenswood School) was an exclusive girls' boarding school founded in Wimbledon, London, by Marie Souvestre in 1883 and operated until the early 1950s, when it was demolished and replaced with a housing development.

History
Allenswood House was located on a large tract of land between Albert Drive and Wimbledon Park Road, in Southfields in the London Borough of Wandsworth, England. It was owned by Henry Hansler and was built in the Tudor Revival style between 1865 and 1870. The house was converted in 1870 by Marie Souvestre and her partner, Paolina Samaïa, into a boarding school for girls. The school, whose students were primarily from the European aristocracy and American upper-class, provided a progressive education to its students. Often called a finishing school, Allenswood had a curriculum that included serious study at a time when education was denied to women, and stressed feminist ideals of social responsibility and personal independence. In addition to learning French, which was the official language spoken at the school, students studied the arts, dance, history, language (English, German, and Italian), literature, music, and philosophy and were required to develop their own analytical skills to assess ideals and challenges.

When Souvestre died in 1905, Samaïa became the headmistress until 1909. She was succeeded by Florence Boyce and then in 1916, by Helen Gifford, one of Eleanor Roosevelt's classmates and Jeanne Dozat. Gifford and Dozat served as co-principals until 1922, when Gifford left to establish Benfleet Hall, a school based on Souvestre's model, in Benhill, Surrey. Dozat was later joined by Enid Michell, who remained as headmistress until the school closed in 1950.

Redevelopment
In 1950, the London County Council and Wandsworth London Borough Council took possession of the site under eminent domain to develop the Wimbledon Park Estate. The school was demolished and a housing development, known as Allenswood Estate, was created on the site.

Noted faculty
Frances Stevenson

Noted alumni
 Hilda Wynnefred Burkinshaw (1885-1962), who in 1908 married Cuthbert Collingwood Lloyd Fitzwilliams (aka C. C. L. Fitzwilliams), a Major in the Welsh Guards. She remained close to Roosevelt and in 1942 hosted a reunion in London of classmates in Roosevelt's honor.
Dorothy Bussy, née Strachey
 Beatrice Chamberlain
 Ethel Chamberlain
 Florence (Ida) Chamberlain
Corinne Alsop Cole, née Robinson
Sibyl, Lady Colefax, née Halsey
Megan Lloyd George
Eleanor Roosevelt
Pernel Strachey, along with three of her sisters
Pippa Strachey 
Mien van Wulfften Palthe, née Broese van Groenou

References

Citations

Bibliography

 

 

1870 establishments in England
1950 disestablishments in England
Defunct schools in the London Borough of Wandsworth
Educational institutions established in 1870
Private girls' schools in London